Gazeta Shqip is a newspaper published in Albania and part of Top Media Group together with Top Albania Radio, Top Gold Radio, part of pay TV platform Digitalb, Top News, VGA Studio, My Music Radio, and musical.

Gazeta Shqip, one of the previous media in Albania, has a success story in its journey. It was launched in print format, and the first print was on 13 March 2006.

After more than 3000 publications, Gazeta Shqip closed the print version on July 16, 2016, and today, continues in online format, with a 12-year archive.

Starting in April 2019, Gazeta Shqip Online redesigned and relaunched with a new website, for desktop and mobile. They decided to retain its authenticity in the logo, only allowing for some changes in the image retention.

They invested in this traditional media, to reach more audiences. Newspaper Gazeta Shqip Online aims are transparency and informing the public.

Gazeta Shqip's most valued services are their quality and independent journalism.

Currently, Gazeta Shqip Online has over 20 million clicks per month, according to official Google Analytics statistics, giving it a place in the top 5 most-visited websites in Albania.

The paper was established on 13 March 2006.

References

External links
Gazeta Shqip 

2006 establishments in Albania
Publications established in 2006
Newspapers published in Albania
Albanian-language newspapers
Democratic Party of Albania